Kennedy is a census-designated place (CDP) in San Joaquin County, California, United States.  The population was 3,356, at the 2020 census, up from 3,254 at the 2000 census.

Geography
Kennedy is located at  (37.931774, -121.251802).

Demographics

2010
The 2010 United States Census reported that Kennedy had a population of 3,254. The racial makeup of Kennedy was 517 (15.9%) White, 200 (6.1%) African American, 23 (0.7%) Native American, 258 (7.9%) Asian, 4 (0.1%) Pacific Islander, 2,109 (64.8%) from other races, and 143 (4.4%) from two or more races. Hispanic or Latino of any race were 2,513 persons (77.2%).

The Census reported that 3,230 people (99.3% of the population) lived in households, 24 (0.7%) lived in non-institutionalized group quarters, and 0 (0%) were institutionalized.

There were 768 households, out of which 460 (59.9%) had children under the age of 18 living in them, 392 (51.0%) were opposite-sex married couples living together, 169 (22.0%) had a female householder with no husband present, 89 (11.6%) had a male householder with no wife present.  There were 55 (7.2%) unmarried opposite-sex partnerships, and 8 (1.0%) same-sex married couples or partnerships. 86 households (11.2%) were made up of individuals, and 41 (5.3%) had someone living alone who was 65 years of age or older. The average household size was 4.21.  There were 650 families (84.6% of all households); the average family size was 4.47.

The population was spread out, with 1,178 people (36.2%) under the age of 18, 371 people (11.4%) aged 18 to 24, 847 people (26.0%) aged 25 to 44, 580 people (17.8%) aged 45 to 64, and 278 people (8.5%) who were 65 years of age or older.  The median age was 26.8 years. For every 100 females, there were 102.0 males.  For every 100 females age 18 and over, there were 103.1 males.

The homeowner vacancy rate was 1.9%; the rental vacancy rate was 7.3%.  1,806 people (55.5% of the population) lived in owner-occupied housing units and 1,424 people (43.8%) lived in rental housing units.

2000
As of the census of 2000, there were 3,275 people, 766 households, and 627 families residing in the CDP. The racial makeup of the CDP was 29.10% White, 9.19% African American, 1.56% Native American, 10.50% Asian, 0.24% Pacific Islander, 44.24% from other races, and 5.16% from two or more races. Hispanic or Latino of any race were 67.42% of the population.

There were 766 households, out of which 47.7% had children under the age of 18 living with them, 53.5% were married couples living together, 20.4% had a female householder with no husband present, and 18.1% were non-families. 12.9% of all households were made up of individuals, and 5.0% had someone living alone who was 65 years of age or older.  The average household size was 4.19 and the average family size was 4.56.

In the CDP, the population was spread out, with 38.1% under the age of 18, 11.5% from 18 to 24, 26.9% from 25 to 44, 16.2% from 45 to 64, and 7.3% who were 65 years of age or older.  The median age was 25 years. For every 100 females, there were 110.7 males.  For every 100 females age 18 and over, there were 111.9 males.

The median income for a household in the CDP was $24,375, and the median income for a family was $27,083. Males had a median income of $30,526 versus $17,019 for females. The per capita income for the CDP was $6,876.  About 42.2% of families and 44.8% of the population were below the poverty line, including 52.1% of those under age 18 and 13.6% of those age 65 or over.

References

Census-designated places in San Joaquin County, California
Census-designated places in California